Sven Gustaf Lindahl (born 25 June 1937, in Stockholm) is a Swedish journalist, songwriter, radio and television presenter. 

As a teenager, he played in a boogie-woogie band. After leaving school, he worked briefly as a welding apprentice in Luton and later studied at an iron foundry in Chesterfield, but eventually came to study journalism at Poppius Journalistskola before he started working at the local newspaper Västerort. 

Lindahl has presented the radio show Svensktoppen for Sveriges Radio. Lindahl has hosted Melodifestivalen, twice in 1963 and 1966. In addition Lindahl commented for Sweden at the 1964 and the 1966 Eurovision Song Contest. Since 1969 Lindahl has been a member of SKAP (Swedish composers of popular music).

References

1937 births
Living people
Musicians from Stockholm
Swedish television personalities
Swedish radio personalities
Swedish songwriters
Swedish journalists